The 840s decade ran from January 1, 840, to December 31, 849.

Significant people
 Al-Mu'tasim
 Al-Wathiq
 Alfred the Great
 Louis the Pious
 Charles the Bald
 Ermentrude of Orléans
 Louis the Stammerer
 Louis the German
 Lothair I
 Kenneth I of Scotland
 Ragnar Lodbrok
 Michael III

References

Citation

Bibliography